The FC Unterföhring is a German association football club from the town of Unterföhring, Bavaria.

The club's greatest success came in 2017 when it qualified for the Regionalliga Bayern, the fourth tier of the German football league system.

History
FC Unterföhring was formed on 6 March 1927.

For most of its history the club has been a non-descript amateur side in local Bavarian football. The club rose to the highest level of football in Upper Bavaria for the first time in 2004, when it won promotion to the tier six Bezirksoberliga Oberbayern by winning the Bezirksliga Oberbayern-Nord. Unterföhring spend the next six seasons in this league, generally achieving good results. In 2009–10 the club was able to win the league and earn promotion to the Landesliga Bayern-Süd.

In the Landesliga Unterföhring achieved an excellent fourth place in its first season there but came only 12th in 2011–12, the last season of the league's existence. This finish was however enough to advance to the promotion round to the expanded Bayernliga. The club managed to defeat TSV Bad Abbach and FC Ergolding in the knock-out rounds and earned the right to compete in the Bayernliga for the first time in 2012–13.

In the new league Unterföhring finished seventh in its first season there and tenth the season after.

The club finished second in the 2016–17 season and was promoted to the Regionalliga Bayern after champions, SV Pullach, were declined promotion. However, it finished in last place in its first season in the Regionalliga and was relegated straight back to the Bayernliga.

Current squad

 (captain)

Honours
The club's honours:
 Bayernliga Süd
 Runners-up: 2017
 Bezirksoberliga Oberbayern
 Champions: 2010
 Runners-up: 2008
 Bezirksliga Oberbayern-Nord
 Champions: 2004

Recent seasons
The recent season-by-season performance of the club:

With the introduction of the Bezirksoberligas in 1988 as the new fifth tier, below the Landesligas, all leagues below dropped one tier. With the introduction of the Regionalligas in 1994 and the 3. Liga in 2008 as the new third tier, below the 2. Bundesliga, all leagues below dropped one tier. With the establishment of the Regionalliga Bayern as the new fourth tier in Bavaria in 2012 the Bayernliga was split into a northern and a southern division, the number of Landesligas expanded from three to five and the Bezirksoberligas abolished. All leagues from the Bezirksligas onward were elevated one tier.

References

External links
 Official team site  
 Das deutsche Fußball-Archiv  historical German domestic league tables
 Manfreds Fussball Archiv  Tables and results from the Bavarian amateur leagues
 FC Unterföhring at Weltfussball.de 

Football clubs in Germany
Football clubs in Bavaria
Football in Upper Bavaria
Association football clubs established in 1927
1927 establishments in Germany
FC Unterföhring